"You're the Storm" is the second single by The Cardigans from their album Long Gone Before Daylight. It was released on 14 July 2003 in Europe.

Video
The official video was directed by Amir Chamdin who had previously directed the video for For What It's Worth.  The video was nominated as "Best Video" at the Grammis Awards. In 2004 Amir Chamdin received the MTV Award for Best Music Video.

Track listings
CD Single
"You're The Storm" 
"Hold Me"

Maxi Single
"You're The Storm" 
"Hold Me" 
"You're The Storm" (Sandkvie Session) 
"You're The Storm" (First Demo)

Charts

References

2003 singles
The Cardigans songs
2003 songs
Songs written by Nina Persson
Songs written by Peter Svensson
Stockholm Records singles